Deltophora suffusella is a moth of the family Gelechiidae. It is found in Paraguay (Chaco).

The length of the forewings is about 5 mm. Adults have been recorded on wing in October and November.

References

Moths described in 1979
Deltophora
Taxa named by Klaus Sattler